Roger Bernard Handberg III is an American lawyer who has served as the United States attorney for the Middle District of Florida since 2021.

Education 
Handberg earned a Bachelor of Arts from the University of North Carolina at Chapel Hill in 1991 and a Juris Doctor from Harvard Law School in 1994.

Career 
From 1994 to 1999, Handberg worked as an associate at King & Spalding in Atlanta. From 1999 to 2002, he served as a senior assistant attorney general in the Florida Attorney General's Office. Handberg served as an assistant United States attorney for the Middle District of Florida from 2002 to 2021.

U.S. attorney 

Handberg was appointed acting United States attorney in 2021. On September 15, 2022, President Joe Biden nominated Handberg to be the United States attorney for the Middle District of Florida. On December 1, 2022, his nomination was reported out of the Senate Judiciary Committee by voice vote. On December 6, 2022, his nomination was confirmed in the Senate by voice vote.

References 

Living people
Year of birth missing (living people)
20th-century American lawyers
21st-century American lawyers
Assistant United States Attorneys
Florida lawyers
Georgia (U.S. state) lawyers
Harvard Law School alumni
United States Attorneys for the Middle District of Florida
University of North Carolina at Chapel Hill alumni